Marquess of Villareal de Álava is a hereditary title in the peerage of Spain, granted in 1889 by Maria Christina of Austria, the queen regent, to María del Carmen de Velasco y Palacios, daughter of Juan de Velasco y Fernández de la Cuesta and of María Antonia de Palacios y Gaytán de Ayala. 

The title makes reference to the town of Villareal de Álava (known in Basque as Legutio), province of Álava.

Marquesses of Villareal de Álava (1889)

María del Carmen de Velasco y Palacios, 1st Marchioness of Villareal de Álava (1859-1919)
José María de Palacio y de Velasco, 2nd Marquess of Villareal de Álava (1882-1945), eldest son of the 1st Marchioness
José María de Palacio y de Palacio, 3rd Marquess of Villareal de Álava (1915-1997), eldest son of the 2nd Marquess
José María de Palacio y Oriol, 4th Marquess of Villareal de Álava (b. ?), eldest son of the 3rd Marquess

See also
Velasco

References

Bibliography
 

Lists of Spanish nobility